Tiberiu Ghioane (born 18 June 1981) is a Romanian former professional footballer. He played most of his career for Dynamo Kyiv as a defensive midfielder before retiring from football in July 2011.

Club career
Ghioane was born in Târgu Secuiesc. Having begun his career with FC Brașov and Rapid București in Romania, he joined FC Dynamo Kyiv in 2001. He remained at the club until his retirement in 2011.

International career
Ghioane played 21 games for his country, including the 2006 FIFA World Cup qualifiers, and scored two goals; the first was in his ninth international appearance against Luxembourg.

He played for Romania in the victory against Lithuania in the World Cup 2010 Qualifiers in June 2009, and scored against Hungary in a friendly in August 2009.

In 2005, Ghioane suffered from a cerebral venous sinus thrombosis which impeded his further successful performance in the club.

Style of play
Ghioane was known for his versatility being also able to play as a fullback and in every midfield position.

Managerial career
In the 2013–14 season, Ghioane started his managerial career with a stint at Liga V – Brașov County team AS Prejmer.

Career statistics

International goals
Scores and results list Romania's goal tally first, score column indicates score after each Ghioane goal.

Honours
Dynamo Kyiv
 Ukrainian League: 2002–03, 2003–04, 2006–07, 2008–09
 Ukrainian Cup: 2002–03, 2004–05, 2005–06, 2006–07
 Ukrainian Super Cup: 2004, 2006, 2007, 2009
 Independent States Cup: 2002

References

External links

 

1981 births
Living people
People from Târgu Secuiesc
Romanian footballers
Association football midfielders
Romania international footballers
FC Brașov (1936) players
FC Rapid București players
FC Dynamo Kyiv players
FC Dynamo-2 Kyiv players
Liga I players
Ukrainian Premier League players
Ukrainian First League players
SR Brașov managers
Romanian football managers
Romanian expatriate footballers
Expatriate footballers in Ukraine
Romanian expatriate sportspeople in Ukraine